Kim Choon-bong (born 15 March 1941) is a North Korean speed skater. He competed in two events at the 1964 Winter Olympics.

References

1941 births
Living people
North Korean male speed skaters
Olympic speed skaters of North Korea
Speed skaters at the 1964 Winter Olympics
Sportspeople from Pyongyang